William Greenleaf Eliot (August 5, 1811 – January 23, 1887) was an American educator, Unitarian minister, and civic leader in Missouri. He is most notable for founding Washington University in St. Louis, and also contributed to the founding of numerous other civic institutions, such as the Saint Louis Art Museum, public school system, and charitable institutions. The modernist poet T. S. Eliot was his grandson.

Early life and education
Eliot was born in New Bedford, Massachusetts, the son of Margaret Greenleaf (Dawes) and William Greenleaf Eliot. After attending the Friends Academy in New Bedford, Eliot attended Columbian College (now the George Washington University) in Washington, D.C., and graduated in 1831.  Eliot did graduate work at Harvard Divinity School and graduated in 1834. He was ordained a minister of the Unitarian church on August 17, 1834.

Career
After his ordination, Eliot moved to St. Louis, where he lived for the rest of his life, until 1887. There he founded the Church of the Messiah, the first Unitarian church west of the Mississippi River. Today it is called the First Unitarian Church of Saint Louis. He led the congregation from 1834 to 1870, through a period of rapid expansion of the city.

Eliot was active in civic life and was instrumental in founding many civic institutions, including the St. Louis Public Schools, the Saint Louis Art Museum, Mission Free School, South Side Day Nursery, and the Western Sanitary Commission to provide medical care and supplies during the Civil War. In 1861, he was part of a small group of men who helped Generals Nathaniel Lyon and Francis P. Blair to retain Missouri in the Union. He contributed to the development of the Colored Orphans' Home, Soldiers' Orphans' Home, Memorial Home, Blind Girls' Home, Women's Christian Home, and other charitable institutions. When Ralph Waldo Emerson visited St. Louis, he met Eliot and called him "the Saint of the West."

Eliot publicly associated himself with the American Colonization Society and served as president of the St. Louis’s Young Men’s Colonization Society. Despite his anti-slavery beliefs and acts of emancipating slaves and assisting in emancipation, he did not agree with Northern abolitionist politics but instead supported gradual emancipation to avoid Civil War.

Eliot had a strong interest in developing educational opportunities in St. Louis. He co-founded Washington University in St. Louis (initially called Eliot Seminary - much to his chagrin) in 1853. He donated funds to its construction and served as its chancellor from 1870 to 1887. In 1859 he founded Mary Institute, a school for girls which he named after his daughter, who died young. It is now part of the co-educational Mary Institute and St. Louis Country Day School.

Eliot was also a writer, publishing Doctrines of Christianity; Lectures to Young Men; Lectures to Young Women (re-printed as Home and Influence); Discipline of Sorrow; and The Story of Archer Alexander: From Slavery to Freedom. These ranged from works of theology in the Unitarian tradition to specific moral advice to young people. He advocated individual responsibility. In public policy he supported women's suffrage and prohibition of alcohol.

Legacy and honors
 Eliot was honored for his civic contributions with a star on the St. Louis Walk of Fame.
 Eliot Unitarian Chapel in Kirkwood, Missouri, is named for W. G. Eliot.

Family
The Eliots had 14 children but not all survived to adulthood. Among their children were Rev. Thomas Lamb Eliot, Regent and Trustee of Reed College, and Henry Ware Eliot, businessman. W.G. Eliot was the grandfather of poet T. S. Eliot, Martha May Eliot, a pediatrician and expert in public health and her sister, Abigail Adams Eliot, co-founder of the Eliot-Pearson School at Tufts University.

Dr. Eliot was the brother of Thomas D. Eliot, U.S. Congressman from Massachusetts. William Greenleaf Eliot's wife, Abigail Adams Cranch, was the daughter of William Cranch, a nephew of Abigail Adams. William G. Eliot's father, mother, and wife were first cousins of each other.  Their mothers were three of the daughters of William Greenleaf (Elizabeth, Margaret and Nancy respectively.)

External links
Eliot family genealogy including William G. Eliot
The Story of Archer Alexander: From Slavery to Freedom, March 30, 1863. Boston: Cupples, Upham and Company; Old Corner Bookstore, 1885.
Facsimile of Lectures to Young Men at University of Michigan
Biographical entry at Washington University in St. Louis
William Greenleaf Eliot Collection at Missouri History Museum Archives

References

Eliot, Charlotte, C. 1904. William Greenleaf Eliot. Houghton, Mifflin & Co., The Riverside Press. Cambridge, MA.
Holt, Earl K. III. 1985. William Greenleaf Eliot—Conservative Radical., published by First Unitarian Church of St. Louis, St. Louis, MO.
William Greenleaf Eliot at Eliot Family Genealogy
Scott, Henry Eliot. 1988. The Family of William Greenleaf Eliot and Abby Adams Eliot, as Chronicled by their Descendants, to 1988

Chancellors of Washington University in St. Louis
American Unitarians
1811 births
1887 deaths
Harvard Divinity School alumni
Columbian College of Arts and Sciences alumni
Eliot family (America)
American temperance activists
Burials at Bellefontaine Cemetery
Washington University in St. Louis faculty